Jaume "Met" Miravitlles i Navarra (Figueres, 18 February 1906 – Barcelona, 10 November 1988) was a Catalan writer, politician, and journalist. He served as Commissary for Propaganda of the Catalan Government during the Spanish Civil War.

He was an acquaintance of Salvador Dalí.

References 
Citations

Bibliography
 

1906 births
1988 deaths
Journalists from Catalonia